Crimean Tatar may refer to:
 Crimean Tatars, an ethnic group
 Crimean Tatar language, a language of the Crimean Tatars

Language and nationality disambiguation pages